Wassana Panyapuek (born 14 December 1968) is a Thai sprinter. She competed in the women's 4 × 100 metres relay at the 1984 Summer Olympics.

References

External links
 

1968 births
Living people
Athletes (track and field) at the 1984 Summer Olympics
Wassana Panyapuek
Wassana Panyapuek
Place of birth missing (living people)
Olympic female sprinters